is a railway station of the JR Hokkaido Nemuro Main Line located in Furano, Hokkaidō, Japan. It opened on December 2, 1900.

Railway stations in Hokkaido Prefecture
Stations of Hokkaido Railway Company
Railway stations in Japan opened in 1900